The 2017–18 FC Rostov season was the club's ninth successive season in the Russian Premier League, the highest tier of football in Russia. Rostov finished the season in 11th place, 2 places and 2 points above the Relegation Playoffs, and reached the Round of 16 in the Russian Cup, where they were eliminated by Amkar Perm.

Season events
On 9 June, Rostov announced Leonid Kuchuk as their new manager on a one-year contract with the option of an additional year. On 6 December, Kuchuk resigned as manager, with Dmitri Kirichenko taking in over in a caretaker capacity the same day. Valeri Karpin was announced as the club's new permanent manager, on a two-and-a-half-year contract on 19 December.

Squad

Out on loan

Transfers

Summer

In:

Out:

Winter

In:

Out:

Trialist

Friendlies

Competitions

Russian Premier League

Results by round

Results

League table

Russian Cup

Squad statistics

Appearances and goals

|-
|colspan="14"|Players away from the club on loan:
|-
|colspan="14"|Players who left Rostov during the season:

|}

Goal scorers

Disciplinary record

References

External links

FC Rostov seasons
Rostov